Idam Porul Yaeval is an unreleased Indian Tamil language drama film directed by Seenu Ramasamy and produced by N. Lingusamy. It features Vijay Sethupathi and Vishnu Vishal alongside Aishwarya Rajesh and Nandita Swetha  in the lead cast. Yuvan Shankar Raja composed the music. The film remains unreleased for almost a decade due to financial difficulties.

Cast

Production 
Following the audio release of Neerparavai (2012), Seenu Ramasamy announced that his next project would be titled Bangalore Thamizhan to be produced by Vasan Visual Ventures and revealed that Vimal had been signed to play a lead role in October 2012. In January 2013, Seenu Ramasamy revealed that Vijay Sethupathi was signed on to play another lead role and that the film will be based around the hills near Madurai and Thandikodi near Kodaikanal, noting that he engaged in research while filming Thenmerku Paruvakaatru (2010) in interior Tamil Nadu, spending a lot of time studying locations near the Kodalangadu village. The film's story was an idea of writer S. Ramakrishnan and Ramasamy developed the screenplay and dialogues.

In May 2013, the film went through significant changes, with the title being changed to Sontha Ooru while Attakathi Dinesh replaced Vimal in a lead role. In a further turn of events in October 2013, it was announced that N. Linguswamy would produce the film and Yuvan Shankar Raja would replace N. R. Raghunanthan as composer. The title was also reverted to Idam Porul Yaeval, while Vishnu Vishal was selected to replace Attakathi Dinesh. In February 2014, Manisha Yadav was signed for the role of a mountain farmer girl after the director had auditioned a few girls for the role. Soon after the shoot had started, Seenu Ramasamy replaced Manisha with Nandita Swetha In April 2014, Aishwarya Rajesh confirmed that she had signed the film and would play Vishnu's love interest. Mu. Kasi Viswanathan was signed up to be the film's editor and Rahul Dharuman of Madha Yaanai Koottam (2013) fame was roped in to be the film's cinematographer.

In April 2014, 30-35 of days of shoot was completed. Shooting took place around the villages surrounding Kodaikanal, which include Poombarai, Padamputhur and Gundupatti. Despite being completed, the film has remained unreleased as a result of Thirupathi Brothers' financial difficulties. After a long a delay, the film was expected to be released after the end of the COVID-19 lockdown in India, to no avail. In October 2022, it was announced that the film will soon have a theatrical release as the production house has sorted out all legal issues.

Soundtrack 

Director Seenu Ramasamy and Vijay Sethupathi, for the first time, worked with Yuvan Shankar Raja to produce Idam Porul Yaeval'''s music. The lyrics were written by Vairamuthu, thus associating with Yuvan Shankar Raja for the first time in his career.Yuvan and Vairamuthu for the first time. The Times of India. 21 January 2014. Retrieved 23 August 2014. The soundtrack album features six tracks and most of the songs were composed after the entire film was shot. The album was released on 18 December 2014 at the Suryan FM radio station in Chennai. The songs, however, had been leaked to the Internet several days before the actual launch.

ReceptionIndiaglitz rated the album 4 out of 5 and stated that "Yuvan's maiden partnership with Vairamuthu has gotten the much needed break for him." Behindwoods.com rated the album 3.0 out of 5 stating "Soulful, earthy songs from Yuvan." MovieCrow rated the album 3.75 out of 5 and stated "Calling this Yuvan's comeback is an understatement. In actually, this is pure, vintage Yuvan Shankar Raja. A winner in one word." Sify gave 3.5 out of 5 and wrote, "Idam Porul Eval'' marks Yuvan's comeback to earthy tunes without the music jarring the lyrical content".

References

External links 
 

Indian drama films
Films scored by Yuvan Shankar Raja
Films shot in Kodaikanal
Unreleased Tamil-language films
Films directed by Seenu Ramasamy
Upcoming films
Films postponed due to the COVID-19 pandemic
Film productions suspended due to the COVID-19 pandemic